Big Robot is a UK company that specialises in developing computer games, registered in Halstead, England. The company was started by Jim Rossignol in 2010.

AVSEQ was released in 2011, Fallen City is in the final bug-testing phase prior to release, while currently under development is Lodestone (on hold). Sir, You Are Being Hunted was released in 2014.

Games

AVSEQ
The name comes from combining audio and visual (audio-visual) with "sequencer". Game play is abstract in nature, and revolves around linking "atom" structures together to gain points. This also unlocks musical notes and activates that level's audio sequencer. The developers claim that "Each AVSEQ level has 2.2300745198530623×10^43 possible audio permutations".

Fallen City
This game is about rebuilding a city which has fallen into decay, which came from an idea by Rossignol that was put to Channel 4 in 2010, and was commissioned by Channel 4 Education. The game aims to educate children, by showing them how persuading people to clean up and repair can raise morale and improve the behaviour of citizens.

The game is played in the first person, the player being able to walk through the city and persuade the citizens, who are known as "Angries", to repair it, clean it up, and rebuild. The Angries change colour according to their mood, purple being the ultimate state of anger and despair. Completing certain tasks gives the Angries extra powers, such as the ability to create street art, and certain infrastructure repairs improve the areas communications and give the community new systems for their benefit. Keith Stuart of The Guardian described some of these—"Reactivating a communications tower will get the word out about clean-up efforts, [...] the trade plaza represents commerce and a system that pumps curry into every home is a great allegory for everyday utilities."

Rossignol says that Fallen City is based around the "broken windows theory" of James Q. Wilson and George L. Kelling, which says that keeping an area in good-repair changes a populations outlook and so prevents further vandalism and prevents a descent into more serious crimes. In an interview in The Guardian, Rossignol states that "The reason the Angries have trashed their city is because they have been promised too much by the people in charge; the promises haven't been fulfilled and they've ended up feeling frustrated and alienated. So they've deliberately trashed the city – to get what they were promised."

Lodestone
Lodestone is an exploration game, the purpose of which is to survive a journey through magnetic islands and the game environment, populated with artificial lifeforms. The game has been put on hold while the company develops its fourth game – Sir, You Are Being Hunted.

Sir, You Are Being Hunted

Created using the Unity game engine.  A Kickstarter pledge drive to fund completion of the game was launched on 2 November 2012.

The Signal From Tölva
A science fiction first-person shooter made with the Unity game engine released in 2017.

Sir, You Are Being Hunted: Reinvented Edition
A savagely funny world of procedurally-generated stealth and survival. Roam wild in spooky British landscapes, all the while being hunted by a menagerie of bloodthirsty robots.

References

External links
 Big Robot website

Video game companies established in 2010
Video game companies of the United Kingdom
Video game development companies